Tuhay Faih ohly Alizade (born 8 July 2002) is a Ukrainian professional footballer of Azerbaijani descent who plays as an attacking midfielder for Ukrainian club Kremin Kremenchuk.

References

External links
 
 

2002 births
Living people
Place of birth missing (living people)
Ukrainian footballers
Ukrainian people of Azerbaijani descent
Ukraine youth international footballers
Association football midfielders
FC Mariupol players
FC Kremin Kremenchuk players
Ukrainian First League players